Salahuddin Ahmed may refer to:

 A. F. Salahuddin Ahmed (1924–2014), Bangladeshi historian
 Salahuddin Ahmed (politician) (born 1960/61), Bangladesh Nationalist Party politician from Cox's Bazar
 Salauddin Ahmed (born 1967), Bangladeshi architect. 
 Sheikh Salahuddin (cricketer) (1969–2013), Bangladeshi international cricketer
 Salahuddin Ahmed Mukti (born 1973), Bangladeshi politician 
 Salahuddin Ahmad, Bangladeshi jurist and Attorney General 2008–2009
 Salahuddin Ahmed (economist), governor of the Bangladesh Bank 2005–2009
 Salah Uddin Ahmed, Bangladesh Nationalist Party politician from Dhaka
Salahuddin Ahmed (judge), Pakistani judge